Declan Nerney (born c. 1959) is an Irish singer-songwriter. Born in Drumlish, County Longford, he started at the age of 16 in a local band, "The Hi-Lows". His big break came with his autobiographical song "The Marquee in Drumlish".

His early education was at the Ennybegs National School in Longford. Later he attended St Mel's College, Longford, where he sat his Leaving Certificate. He was brought up on a small farm and has a passion for vintage tractors. His niece, Una Healy, was a member of the band The Saturdays.

Bands
 The Hi-Lo's
 Gene Stuart Band
 Brian Coll and the Buckaroos

Songs and songwriting
Working with Henry McMahon, he has penned songs such as

 Marquee in Drumlish
 Anna from Fermanagh
 Gotta get up in the Mornin'''
 Christmas Hooley Barry & Dunne Three Way Love Affair Hooley in the Sun ''

References

External links
 Declan Nerney website
 Declan Nerney CDs & DVDs

Irish country singers
Irish male singers
Living people
Musicians from County Longford
Date of birth missing (living people)
Year of birth uncertain
People educated at St Mel's College
Year of birth missing (living people)